The Oakland Estuary is the strait in the San Francisco Bay Area, California, separating the cities of Oakland and Alameda and the Alameda Island from the East Bay mainland. On its western end, it connects to San Francisco Bay proper, while its eastern end connects to San Leandro Bay.

Crossings
The Estuary is spanned by two underwater tubes and three bridges.  They are, from west to east:
Webster Street Tube
Posey Tube
Park Street Bridge
Fruitvale Bridge
High Street Bridge

Early history
Although the estuary was used by Native American tribes inhabiting the local area since about 4000 BC, the earliest recorded history of the Oakland Estuary dates primarily from events extending back to the 19th century, as detailed in a research study conducted by Earth Metrics for the U.S. Army Corps of Engineers (Earth Metrics, 1990)(Shreffler, 1994).  The Oakland Estuary and tributary stream channels were used for shipping transport regularly by the 1850s; early maritime commerce featured movement of lumber and cattle hides. At this time land west of Lake Merritt Slough consisted of undeveloped marshlands.  In 1853 the first dredging project of this estuary was initiated, to enable ferry service to San Francisco.  By the late 19th century further landside development occurred featuring wharf expansions, railroad service and shipbuilding.  
The estuary was dredged by the Army Corps of Engineers, making Alameda an island in 1913. Coast Guard island, originally known as Government Island, was formed in 1913 by the dredging project that extended the Oakland Estuary to San Leandro Bay.

Rowing

In recent years, several rowing clubs have chosen the Oakland Estuary to be their home. The teams include UC Berkeley Rowing, the California Rowing Club, Berkeley High School Crew, Artemis Rowing Club, Oakland Technical High School Rowing, East Bay Rowing Club, and the Oakland Strokes

Notes
 Historical research of land use and industry in the federal ship channel study area, Oakland, California, Earth Metrics Inc., prepared for and published by the U.S. Army Corps of Engineers, San Francisco District, San Francisco, California (1990)
 Shreffler, D.K., R.M. Tilson, B.I. Wells and J.Q. Word, Tier one ecological evaluation of proposed discharge of dredged materials from the Oakland Harbor to ocean waters , Battelle Marine Sciences Laboratory, prepared for and published by the U.S. Army Corps of Engineers, San Francisco District, San Francisco, California (1994)

See also

References

Geography of Alameda County, California
Straits of California
San Francisco Bay
Geography of Alameda, California
Geography of Oakland, California
Bodies of water of Alameda County, California